Eugenio Sanchez Jr., commonly known by his stage name Junior Sanchez, is an American record producer, DJ, artist, re-mixer and record executive from New Jersey.

Early life
Junior Sanchez was born in New Jersey, on May 4, 1977, and raised in the Ironbound. His family is from the state of Bahia, Brazil.

Career
Sanchez has worked in the music business as a record executive president and A&R. At 17, he became A&R for the independent New Jersey label Rufftrax, signing producers James Christian and B.O.P. He also ran his own label Cube Recordings which released material from Felix Da Housecat, Steve Mac, Paul Woolford, and DJ Sneak, and was also President of A&R for various label's Junior now operates his own record label "Brobot Records" distributed by Armada Music.

Junior has released original music under these names or aliases: The Controllers [w/ Steve Mac], S-Men [W/ DJ Sneak + Roger Sanchez], Da Mongoloids [A DJ Collective w/ Armand Van Helden, Daft Punk, DJ Sneak, Roger Sanchez, Todd Terry, Ian Pooley, Laidback Luke, Basement Jaxx, and The Rhythm Masters], Da Shapeshifta Project [W/ Harry “Choo Choo” Romero], Dark Heads [W/ Dave Carlucci], Nitebreed [W/ Harry “Choo Choo” Romero], Output/Teletronik [W/ Chris Haliani], Riot Society [W/ Laidback Luke + Chris Haliani], and Subspecies [W/ Armand Van Helden].

Writing collaborations include Azealia Banks, Katy Perry, Stuart Price, Armand Van Helden, Thomas Bangalter, Ima Robot, Claude Kelly, Crookers, Stacy Barthe, Morningwood, Green Velvet, Mýa, Michelle Bell, Soshy, Princess Superstar, Bush, Bryce Wilson, and Good Charlotte.

Production and remixes include Daft Punk, Madonna, Shakira, Katy Perry, Ariana Grande, Good Charlotte, Placebo, The Bravery, Gorillaz, Blaqk Audio, Hot Hot Heat, Róisín Murphy, Felix Da Housecat, The Faint, New Order, Emiliana Torrini, Jamiroquai, Giorgio Moroder, Moving Units, Les Rhythmes Digitales.

Discography

Compilations
 SubSpecies* / Junior Sanchez – From Da East / Da Bionic Trax (CD, Comp) Rhythm Republic  1996

DJ mixes
 Cube Recordings (CD)  DJ Magazine     2001  
 Seize The Fewcha   Nervous Records        2011

Singles and extended plays
 "Alive at Night" (featuring Ineabell)
 "Deeper Love" (with Sultan & Ned Shepard)
 "Without You" (with CeCe Peniston)
 "Salt" (vs. Bad Suns)
 Dave Carlucci & Junior Sanchez – Rufftrax On Wax (EP)  | Rufftrack Records    1994 
 Dave Carlucci & Junior Sanchez – The Guardian Of Ruff EP (12", EP) | Rufftrack Records  1994
 Harry "Choo Choo" Romero & Junior Sanchez – Bad Little Kiddies | Gossip Records   1996 
 Da Bionic Trax | Strictly Rhythm     1996 
 Da Shape Of Da 80s | Narcotic Records         1998 
 Rhythm Masters And Junior Sanchez – Da New Age Funksters | Junior London  1999 
 2Morrows Future 2Day (2x12") | R-Senal        1999  
 Old Tracky Bastard (12") | Armed Records    1999 
 The Man-E-Facez EP  | Yoshitoshi Recordings        2000  
 Junior Sanchez Featuring Angie Johnson – That Girl Ain't Right | R-Senal   2000 
 Junior Sanchez & Rhythm Masters Are New Age Funkstas – Rock Your Body (12") | Cube Recordings 2000  
 Armand Van Helden & Junior Sanchez – Stanton Music Sampler No. 1 Stanton Magnetics, LLC 2000 
 Junior Sanchez Feat. Dajae* – B With U  3345 Recordings      1999  
 Executes Cubizm 1.0 (12") Cube Recordings CUB 01    2000 
 Junior Sanchez and Christian Smith – R United  Cube Recordings      2001  
 Dancin Next To Me (12") Not On Label JUNBUG 01   2001 
 Junior Sanchez and Rhythm Masters – Are New Age Funkstars (12") House Works    2001 
 Steve Mac and Junior Sanchez – The Controllers (Essential DJ Toolz) Dis-Funktional Recordings 2001 
 Superincumbent / I Wanna Rock! (12", W/Lbl)  Cube Recordings  ZCUB 14    2003  
 Neoteric Version 1 (12") Cube Recordings CUB 14    2003 
 The Last Dance (12")  Big & Dirty  BADR.002       2005  
 Junior Sanchez Feat. Good Charlotte – Elevator (12") Rise RISE 492  2010 
 Harry Romero*, Junior Sanchez & Alexander Technique Feat Shawnee Taylor – Where You Are (12") Sneakerz Muzik 2011     
 Dim Mak Attack EP (3xFile, MP3, EP, 320) Dim Mak Records DM 293  2012 
 Junior Sanchez featuring CeCe Peniston* – Without You (File, MP3, Single, 320) Size Records   2014 
 Junior Sanchez with Todd Terry – Figure Of Jazz (Freeze Records)  2018
 Junior Sanchez – Fundamentals EP (Stmpd Rcrds)  2018
 Todd Terry and Junior Sanchez – Figure of Jazz (Freeze Records)  2019
 Junior Sanchez – Without Your Love (Armada Music)  2019
 Junior Sanchez – Blueprint EP (Kaluki Musik)  2019
 Junior Sanchez – Hard to Resist (Too Many Rules)  2019
 Junior Sanchez – Everyday EP (Circus Recordings)  2019
 Junior Sanchez and Boris – Move It (Saved Records)  2020
 Junior Sanchez featuring Lee Wilson – Music So Special (Undisputed Music)  2021

Remixes
1998: Daft Punk – "Revolution 909" (Roger & Junior's Revolutionary War Mix)
2019: Huxley and Javi Bora – "You're Everything" (Junior Sanchez Remix)
2019: Chris Willis and Lenny Fontana – "Top of the World" (Junior Sanchez Remix)

Miscellaneous
 Harry Romero, Junior Sanchez & Alexander Technique Feat Shawnee Taylor – Where You Are (3xFile, MP3, 320)  Size Records          2010  
 Junior Sanchez featuring Karmen – I Believe In (Remixes) (2xFile, MP3, 320)  Size Records   2011     
 Junior Sanchez featuring Karmen – I Believe In (3xFile, MP3, 320)  Size Records    2011     
 Junior Sanchez and Bad Suns – Salt (File, MP3, 320)  Size Records  2014     
 Junior Sanchez and Sultan & Shepard – Deeper Love (File, MP3, 320) Size Records  2014

References

External links
 [ Junior Sanchez at AllMusic.com]
 
 Junior's Bio
 Junior's Video Interview on Vimeo

1977 births
Living people
American DJs
Record producers from New Jersey
People from Belleville, New Jersey
Musicians from Newark, New Jersey
Culture of Newark, New Jersey
Remixers
Stmpd Rcrds artists
Electronic dance music DJs